Cilfynydd Rugby Football Club is a Welsh rugby union club based in Cilfynydd in Pontypridd, Wales. The club is a member of the Welsh Rugby Union.

Club badge
The Cilfynydd RFC badge consists of a yellow and black shield split into quarters. The four quarters each contain an icon symbolising the culture of Cilfynydd; the Old Bridge, Pontypridd, the Welsh flower, the daffodil, a coal mine winding tower and finally the Prince of Wales's feathers.

Club honours
Glamorgan County Silver Ball Trophy 1983/84 - Winners
Glamorgan County Silver Ball Trophy 1984/85 - Winners

Notable former players
  Iorrie Isaacs 1933
  Stanley Powell 1935
  Joe Jones ≤1936
  Maldwyn James 1947
  Glyn Davies 1947

References

Welsh rugby union teams